Mikael Gayme (born 22 October 1979) is a Chilean alpine skier. He competed at the 2002 Winter Olympics and the 2006 Winter Olympics.

References

1979 births
Living people
Chilean male alpine skiers
Olympic alpine skiers of Chile
Alpine skiers at the 2002 Winter Olympics
Alpine skiers at the 2006 Winter Olympics
Sportspeople from Caracas
21st-century Chilean people